Romaine Jennifer Hart (14 June 1933 – 28 December 2021) was a British film executive. She opened a stylish cinema named the The Screen on the Green in Islington. She had a small film distribution company that ran a number of cinemas.

Life 
Hart was born in Streatham in 1933 and left school at sixteen in Brighton. She was the only child of Goldie and Alex Bloom and she went to secretarial college and was then allowed to help organise the Royal Cinema in Deal. She was left with a financial interest in Bloom Theatres in 1968.

Her The Screen on the Green cinema re-opened on 13 September 1970 after the "fleapit" Rex cinema in Islington was inherited by her.  It was comprehensively modernised in February 1981 by architects Fletcher Priest, who used chrome and glass to restyle the building. They created a foyer space, which reduced the cinema's capacity to 300 seats. Robert Redford in the 1969 film Downhill Racer was an inspired choice for the first film at the Screen on the Green (which Quentin Tarantino would call the "coolest cinema in London") and the audience included Richard Attenborough, Laurence Olivier and Brian Forbes. Her programmer was Roger Austin. The cinema screened important films including Picnic at Hanging Rock, Monty Python’s Life of Brian, Nashville, Taxi Driver and Pink Flamingoes. Her cinemas ran all right showings and costs were kept low. Stephen Woolley was one of her staff and he remembers how staff would sell ice cream between double bills at one o'clock in the morning.

The Screen on the Green was joined by six other mostly London cinemas including Screen on the Hill in Belsize Park, The Screen on Baker Street and The Screen Cinema in Winchester. The cinemas had different characters, the Screen on the Green was punk whereas the Screen on the Hill was known for its club for children that attracted celebrities including leading literati; Roald Dahl, Michael Palin and local executive Tom Maschler.

Hart solved her problem of getting films by starting her own film distribution company. She owned the rights in the UK to films including Maîtresse, The Fourth Man, This Is Spinal Tap, My Beautiful Laundrette, Pee-wee's Big Adventure and The Loveless.

She sat on the board of the National Film and Television School and the National Film Finance Corporation led by David Puttnam.

She was awarded the OBE in 1993.

In 2008 her cinema circuit was sold to the Everyman Media Group for £7m.

Romaine Hart died on 28 December 2021 at the age of 88.

References 

1933 births
2021 deaths
People from Streatham
Film studio executives